Two elections to the United States House of Representatives were held in Florida in 1868, the first for the 40th Congress and the second for the 41st Congress

Background
Florida had been unrepresented in Congress since January 21, 1861, when its sole Representative and both Senators withdrew from Congress following the secession of Florida from the Union.  Following the end of the Civil War, an election had been held in 1865, but it was rejected by Congress.  In 1868, Congress readmitted Florida following Reconstruction.

May 5 election

Hamilton was seated on July 1, 1868, during the 2nd session of the 40th Congress.

December 29 election

See also
United States House of Representatives elections, 1868
Reconstruction Era

References

1868
Florida
United States House of Representatives